Yvon Okemba (born 5 February 1966) is a Congolese footballer. He played in four matches for the Congo national football team from 1992 to 1996. He was also named in Congo's squad for the 1992 African Cup of Nations tournament.

References

1966 births
Living people
Republic of the Congo footballers
Republic of the Congo international footballers
1992 African Cup of Nations players
Place of birth missing (living people)
Association football defenders